In Greek mythology, Paean (Ancient Greek: Παιάν), Paeëon or Paieon (Παιήων), or Paeon or Paion (Παιών) was the physician of the gods.

Mycenaean Greece

Homer and Hesiod
A god of healing named  is mentioned twice in the Iliad. In book 5, the Olympian god of war Ares is wounded by mortal hero Diomedes, who is assisted by Athena. Ares is taken up to Olympus in a hurry, where Paeon applies medicine that produces an instant relief. Hades too had a similar medical treatment by Paeon when he was shot with an arrow by Heracles. In the Odyssey, Homer says of Egypt, "[T]here the earth, the giver of grain, bears greatest store of drugs, many that are healing when mixed, and many that are baneful; there every man is a physician, wise above human kind; for they are of the race of Paeeon."

Hesiod identifies Paeon as an individual deity: "Unless Phoebus Apollo should save him from death, or Paean himself who knows the remedies for all things."

In time, Paeon (more usually spelled Paean) became an epithet of Apollo, in his capacity as a god capable of bringing disease and therefore propitiated as a god of healing. Later, Paeon becomes an epithet of Asclepius, the healer-god. Later, perhaps due to his identification with Apollo, Helios was also invoked as "Paion."

Notes

References

 Connor, Peter, "Paeon" in Gods, Goddesses, and Mythology, Publisher: Marshall Cavendish Corporation (January 2005). .
 
 Gantz, Early Greek Myth: A Guide to Literary and Artistic Sources, Johns Hopkins University Press, 1996, Two volumes:  (Vol. 1),  (Vol. 2).
 
 Homer. The Iliad with an English Translation by A.T. Murray, Ph.D. in two volumes. Cambridge, Massachusetts., Harvard University Press; London, William Heinemann, Ltd. 1924.
 Homer. The Odyssey with an English Translation by A.T. Murray, PH.D. in two volumes. Cambridge, Massachusetts., Harvard University Press; London, William Heinemann, Ltd. 1919.
 Farnell, Lewis Richard, The Cults of the Greek States vol. ΙV, Cambridge University Press, 2010, .
 
 Smith, William; Dictionary of Greek and Roman Biography and Mythology, London (1873). "Paean"

External links
 Theoi Project - Paion

Deities in the Iliad
Greek gods
Health gods
Mythological Greek physicians
Epithets of Apollo
Epithets of Asclepius
Epithets of Helios
Olympian deities